Scúp ("Scoop") is a Northern Irish drama television series which was broadcast on TG4 and BBC Northern Ireland in 2013–14. The series was nominated to the Special Irish Language Award at the 11th Irish Film & Television Awards in 2014.

Plot
Rob Cullan is sacked from his job at The Guardian following a phone hacking scandal. He returns home to Belfast where Diarmuid Black puts him in charge of failing Irish language newspaper An Nuacht.
The editor has just dropped dead, the boss – Diarmuid – is writing bouncing cheques to cover his debts, the paper is full of propaganda but has no news. It's up to Rob to turn it around with the help of reporters and a young photographer – but in his first week he has already crossed a powerful gang boss and discovered that not all the staff are what they seem. 
Tightly written by newspaper editor and thriller writer Colin Bateman and translated into idiomatic Irish by Peadar Cox, the series launched a host of young Irish acting talent.

Cast

 Don Wycherley as Rob (14 episodes, 2013–2014)
 Kelly Gough as Alix (14 episodes, 2013–2014)
 Denis Conway as Diarmuid (14 episodes, 2013–2014)
 Caitríona Ní Mhurchú as Janine (14 episodes, 2013–2014)
 Donncha Crowley as Cormac (14 episodes, 2013–2014)
 Tim Creed as Michael (8 episodes, 2013)
 Patrick McBride as Seán (8 episodes, 2013)
 Conor MacNeill as Gerry (6 episodes, 2014)
 Shane Fallon as Patrick (6 episodes, 2014)

References

External links
 

2013 Irish television series debuts
2014 Irish television series endings
Irish drama television series
BBC Northern Ireland television shows
Irish-language television shows
TG4 original programming
Television shows set in Belfast
2010s television series from Northern Ireland